"Nobody's Girl" is a single by Canadian country music artist Michelle Wright. Released in 1996, it was the first single from her album For Me It's You. The song reached #1 on the RPM Country Tracks chart in August 1996.

Chart performance

Year-end charts

References

1996 singles
Michelle Wright songs
Songs written by Gretchen Peters
Arista Nashville singles
Music videos directed by Steven Goldmann
1996 songs